Paavola is a Finnish surname. Notable people with the surname include:

 (born 1976), Finnish painter
 Pekka Paavola (born 1933), Finnish politician
 Rodney Paavola (1939–1995), American ice hockey player

Finnish-language surnames